Kirnach may refer to:

Kirnach (Brigach), a river of Baden-Württemberg, Germany, tributary of the Brigach
Kirnach (Wertach), a river of Bavaria, Germany, tributary of the Wertach